Grandes éxitos or Grandes Éxitos may refer to:

Grandes Éxitos (Billo album) (1996)
Grandes éxitos (Chayanne album) (2002)
Grandes éxitos (Jarabe de Palo album) (2003)
Grandes Éxitos (Luis Miguel album) (2005)
Grandes éxitos (Los Prisioneros album) (1991)
Grandes Éxitos (Mónica Naranjo album) (2002)
Grandes Éxitos (Shakira album) (2002)
Grandes Exitos (Westlife album) (2002)
Grandes Éxitos 1991–2004, an album by Alejandro Sanz
Oro: Grandes Éxitos, a compilation album by ABBA
Mucho Azúcar – Grandes Éxitos, an album by Azúcar Moreno
Grandes Éxitos, a 1984 album by Gary Low

See also
 Éxitos (disambiguation)
 Éxitos Originales (disambiguation) 
 14 Grandes Éxitos, an album by Luis Miguel
 Los grandes éxitos en español, a 1999 album by Cypress Hill
 Greatest hits
 20 Grandes Éxitos (Los Fabulosos Cadillacs)
 20 Grandes Éxitos (Enanitos Verdes album)
 20 – Grandes Éxitos (Laura Pausini album) or 20 – The Greatest Hits